Thomas Stephen Tarvin (born June 2, 1951) is an American politician from Georgia. Tarvin is a Republican member of the Georgia House of Representatives, representing the 2nd District since 2014.

Early life 
On June 2, 1951, Tarvin was born in Chickamauga, Georgia.

Education 
Tarvin attended University of Georgia.

Career 
On February 4, 2014, Tarvin won the special election and became a Republican member of the Georgia House of Representatives for District 2. Tarvin defeated Neal Florence with 53.86% of the votes. Tarvin was sworn into office on February 11, 2014.

On November 4, 2014, as an incumbent, Tarvin won the election unopposed and continued serving District 2. On November 8, 2016, as an incumbent, Tarvin won the election unopposed and continued serving District 2. votes. On November 6, 2018, as an incumbent, Tarvin won the election and continued serving District 2. Tarvin defeated Michelle Simmons with 99.9% of the votes. On November 3, 2020, incumbent, Tarvin won the election unopposed and continued serving District 2. 
votes.

Tarvin has sponsored 64 bills. The American Conservative Union gave him an 80% evaluation in 2019.

Personal life 
Tarvin's wife is Jennifer Tarvin. They have two children. Tarvin and his family live in Chickamauga, Georgia.

References

External links 
 Steve Tarvin at ballotpedia.org

Republican Party members of the Georgia House of Representatives
21st-century American politicians
Living people
People from Walker County, Georgia
1951 births